Post turtle is a phrase that has been used in political discourse of various countries, particularly in North America, based on an old joke. Various politicians have been referenced by the joke or used the joke, including Bill Clinton, George W Bush, Barack Obama, Donald Trump, and Joe Biden.

The joke
An old Rancher is talking about politics with a young man from the city. He compares a politician to a "post turtle." The young man doesn't understand and asks him what a post turtle is.

The old man says, "When you're driving down a country road and you see a fence post with a turtle balanced on top, that's a post turtle. You know he didn't get up there by himself. He doesn't belong there; you wonder who put him there; he can't get anything done while he's up there; and you just want to help the poor thing down."

Notable usage
Ronald E. Poelman used the post turtle reference referring to himself when he was first appointed as a general authority for the Church of Jesus Christ of Latter-day Saints during General Conference in April, 1978, saying, "Like the little turtle who found himself on the top of a fence post, I know that I did not reach this place by myself."

Mary Doria Russell used the post turtle reference in her 1996 novel The Sparrow, attributing it to Father D.W. Yarborough, leader of the first Earth expedition to another planet. Yarborough refers to post turtles in the context of seeming anomalies in nature and regards them as proof of the existence of God, specifically of God trying to get our attention.

The Natural: The Misunderstood Presidency of Bill Clinton by Joe Klein, published in 2002, quotes Clinton as saying: "If you see a turtle sitting on top of a fence post, it didn't get there by accident." According to Klein, this was Clinton's way of claiming partial responsibility for "the historic prosperity and the global peace that attended his time in office".

Molly Ivins is attributed to usage for George W. Bush.

In 2008, Steve Benen, lead blogger for the liberal "The Political Animal" at Washington Monthly, referred to Eric Cantor as a post turtle.

At the 2010 CMAs, Brad Paisley used the phrase in his acceptance speech for Entertainer of the Year.

References

External links
Further examples of the "post turtle" joke at The Big Apple.

Animals in politics
Political terminology
Political satire
Metaphors referring to animals
Internet memes